Poliana is a genus of moths in the family Sphingidae. The genus was erected by Walter Rothschild and Karl Jordan in 1903.

Species
Poliana albescens Inoue 1996
Poliana buchholzi (Plotz 1880)
Poliana leucomelas Rothschild & Jordan 1915
Poliana micra Rothschild & Jordan 1903
Poliana wintgensi (Strand 1910)

References

Sphingini
Moth genera
Taxa named by Walter Rothschild
Taxa named by Karl Jordan